Lawen Redar (born 1989) is a Swedish-Iranian politician currently sitting in the Riksdag with the Social Democrats. She holds a law degree from Stockholm University.

References  

1989 births
Living people
Members of the Riksdag 2014–2018
Women members of the Riksdag
Members of the Riksdag from the Social Democrats
21st-century Swedish women politicians
Members of the Riksdag 2018–2022
Members of the Riksdag 2022–2026
Swedish people of Iranian descent